Feodosy Mikhailovich Vakhrushov (February 26, 1870 – December 8, 1931) was a Russian painter.

Biography
Feodosy Vakhrushov was born in Totma, Vologda Governorate, Russian Empire.

The drawings of young Vakhrushev attracted the attention of Khaminova, the widow of a wealthy merchant. She was an educated woman who occasionally stopped in Totma, making trips from Solvychegodsk to Saint Petersburg. Khaminova helped him move to Tsarskoye Selo, where he lived for two years in the family of M. N. Vasiliev, adjunct professor of the Academy of Arts.

In 1886–1888 he studied at the School of Drawing, Sculpture and Architecture at the Imperial Academy of Arts.

In 1890 he became a student at the Academy of Arts.

Since 1895, he was taught by the notable painter Ilya Repin for two years.

Gallery

External links
 Вахрушов Феодосий Михайлович. Официальный портал правительства Вологодской области.

1870 births
1931 deaths
19th-century painters from the Russian Empire
20th-century Russian painters
People from Totemsky Uyezd